Lindalee Tracey ( – ) was a Canadian broadcast journalist, documentary filmmaker, writer, and exotic dancer. She is best known for the documentary film Not a Love Story, a controversial 1981 film about pornography. Her credits include work on many films on controversial topics.

Career
Her appearance as a journalist in the film Not a Love Story marked a career change for Tracey. Bonnie Sherr Klein, one of the film's producers, described meeting Tracey when she was working as a stripper in Montreal. Sherr Klein described being impressed that Tracey's act was different from those of other women she met researching the film—playful and intelligent, allowing her to retain a greater measure of autonomy and self-respect.  Tracey was hired to serve as one of the film's researchers and presenters.

Following her work on the film Tracey started working as a writer and researcher, and later a producer. Tracey and her husband, Peter Raymont, set up a production company that produced many of their later works.  Most of the documentaries she worked on were serious, issue-oriented films.

She and Raymont created the television drama The Border, which was eventually broadcast in 2008.

Death and legacy
Tracey died on October 19, 2006 after a four-year battle with breast cancer.

Tracey's friends and family created the Lindalee Tracey Award to celebrate her memory and her accomplishments. A Canadian filmmaker is given the annual award at the Hot Docs film festival in Toronto.

Filmography
Not a Love Story: A Film About Pornography (1981)
A 20th Century Chocolate Cake (1983)
Other Tongues (1984)
Abby, I Hardly Knew Ya (1995)
 An English Sense of Justice
 Passing The Flame: The Legacy of Women's College Hospital (1997)
The Undefended Border (2002)
Bhopal: The Search for Justice (2004)
 Shake Hands With the Devil: The Journey of Romeo Dallaire (2004) - Producer
 The Border (2008 - 38 X 1 hr) - Co-Creator 
 The Anatomy of Burlesque

References

Further reading
 Barbara Korte: Another world. Lindalee Tracey's journey into poor Canada and traditions of home touring. In: New worlds. Discovering and constructing the unknown in anglophone literature. Presented to Walter Pache on the occasion of his 60th birthday. Ed. by Martin Kuester, Gabriele Christ, Rudolf Beck. Vögel, Munich 2000 (Schriften der Philosophischen Fakultäten der Universität Augsburg, 59, Literatur- und sprachwissenschaftliche Reihe) pp 261–276

External links

1957 births
2006 deaths
Canadian documentary film directors
Canadian women film directors
Canadian female erotic dancers
Deaths from breast cancer
Canadian documentary film producers
Canadian women journalists
Canadian women non-fiction writers
Canadian women film producers
Canadian women documentary filmmakers